Christ Church, Winchester is a Church of England parish church in Winchester, England. There are approximately 475 members on the electoral roll.  It is also in partnership with the diocese of Muhubura and with St Nicholas Church in Kalerwe, Kampala, both in Uganda.

Activity
Christ Church has links with, and provides support to, institutions within the parish, including the Royal Hampshire County Hospital, Winchester Prison and the University of Winchester. It is an active participant in Churches Together Winchester, which supports the Winchester Night Shelter, Basics Bank and Street Pastors.

Current clergy
Simon Cansdale is the current vicar, having been installed in November 2019. James Whymark, Clare Carson and Marianne Foster are all curates, and Brian Wakelin and Amanda Denniss are assistant ministers.

Previous clergy
A previous vicar, David Williams, became Bishop of Basingstoke on 19 September 2014.

References

External links
 Church website
 Church main Facebook Page
 A Church Near You entry

Church of England church buildings in Hampshire
Christ Church
Ewan Christian buildings
19th-century Church of England church buildings